Eleftherios Fotiadis (born 15 July 1965) is a former professional Greek footballer.

Fotiadis made 25 appearances in the 2. Bundesliga for Tennis Borussia Berlin during his playing career. He also played for PAS Giannina F.C. in the Alpha Ethniki.

References

External links 
 

1965 births
Living people
Greek footballers
Association football forwards
2. Bundesliga players
Super League Greece players
Tennis Borussia Berlin players
PAS Giannina F.C. players
Greek expatriate footballers
Expatriate footballers in Germany